Ettore Giannini (15 December 1912 – 15 November 1990) was an Italian screenwriter and film director. He wrote for eight films between 1940 and 1967.

Filmography
 The White Angel (1943, director)
 Crossroads of Passion (1948, director)
 Europa '51 (1952) - Andrea Casatti
 The City Stands Trial (1952, writer)
 Neapolitan Carousel (1954, director and writer)
 Master Stroke (1967, writer)

References

External links

1912 births
1990 deaths
Accademia Nazionale di Arte Drammatica Silvio D'Amico alumni
Film people from Naples
Italian male screenwriters
Italian film directors
20th-century Italian screenwriters
20th-century Italian male writers